The General in Chief of the Armies of the Confederate States, or simply General in Chief, was the military commander of the Confederate States Army (CSA) from February to April 1865. The office was effectively abolished on April 9, 1865, when General Robert E. Lee surrendered to the Federal forces at Appomattox, Virginia. Despite being the General in chief, the title defined a role rather than making Lee something that could be called the highest ranking Confederate general officer; the seven full generals of the CSA were delineated solely by seniority, topped by General Samuel Cooper.

History

On January 31, 1865, the 2nd Confederate States Congress provided “for the appointment of a General in Chief of the Armies of the Confederate States.” On February 6, General Robert E. Lee was appointed to the position and served in that capacity until the end of the American Civil War. Lee retained command of the Army of Northern Virginia, serving in both assignments de facto until April 9, 1865, when he surrendered to Federal forces at Appomattox, Virginia.

The appointment of a general-in-chief had been debated as early as February 27, 1862. President Jefferson Davis voiced his rejection (and veto) of creating this position to the 1st Confederate States Congress on March 14, 1862, believing that such a general could "command an army or armies without the will of the President." Davis performed many of the responsibilities of a general in chief himself throughout the war, acting as both a military operations manager and commander-in-chief. Lee (from March to May 1862) and General Braxton Bragg (from February 1864 to January 1865) also performed related duties, as they were military advisers to Davis, or "charged with the conduct of military operations in the armies of the Confederacy."

See also 

 General officers in the Confederate States Army

Notes

References

Further reading

External links

 

1865 establishments in the Confederate States of America
1865 disestablishments in the Confederate States of America
Confederate States Army
 
Robert E. Lee